Robert Carl Ignatius Katter (born 3 March 1977) is an Australian politician. He serves as the member of the Legislative Assembly of Queensland for Traeger, having previously represented Mount Isa from 2012 to 2017. He is the leader of Katter's Australian Party, having taken over from his father Bob Katter in February 2020.

Biography

Early life
Katter was born on 3 March 1977 in North Queensland. His father is Bob Katter, the federal member for Kennedy and founder of Katter's Australian Party, and his grandfather Bob Katter Sr. was also a federal MP. He received a Bachelor of Applied Science in Property Economics from the Queensland University of Technology.

Early career
Katter started his career as a mine worker in Mount Isa, before working as a property valuer for fifteen years and running a small business in Mount Isa.

Political career (2012–present)
He won Mount Isa at the 2012 state election, pushing Labor incumbent Betty Kiernan into third place. He capitalised on his family's name recognition in the area. Mount Isa was virtually coextensive with the western portion of his father's federal seat of Kennedy, and much of the eastern portion of the seat was once part of the elder Katter's old state seat of Flinders.

After his election to the Legislative Assembly, he became Queensland leader of his father's party, but on 29 November 2012, it was announced that he had been succeeded as leader by Ray Hopper, and would become the party's "parliamentary secretary". Following Hopper's defeat at the 2015 election, Katter once again became state leader.

The state electorate of Mount Isa was abolished in 2017, and Katter followed most of his constituents into the new seat of Traeger. The new seat was essentially the northern, more urbanised portion of Katter's former seat, and is based on Mount Isa. The seat was created as a comfortably safe KAP seat, and Katter won it handily.

He serves on the boards of the Laura Johnson Home, a retirement home, and the Southern Gulf Catchments, an environmental organisation.

In February 2020, he was appointed leader of the Katter's Australian Party.

Political views
In 2020, Katter called for the federal government to buy back Qantas Airline.

In April 2022, Katter said he will move a bill to ban transgender athletes from women's sport in the state. In May 2022, he proposed a motion which was voted down 49 votes to 33. The opposition Liberal National Party of Queensland voted with him.

Personal life

Katter is married to Daisy (nee Hatfield), a former journalist. They met when Daisy was working for WIN Television in Townsville on an assignment to interview him. They have one child, Peaches Grace Katter, born 2020.

References

|-

1977 births
Australian people of Irish descent
Australian people of Lebanese descent
Australian monarchists
Katter's Australian Party politicians
Members of the Queensland Legislative Assembly
Living people
21st-century Australian politicians
Queensland University of Technology alumni